{{DISPLAYTITLE:Zeta1 Muscae}}

Zeta1 Muscae, Latinized from ζ1 Muscae and abbreviated ζ1 Mus, is a suspected astrometric binary star system in the constellation Musca, located 2.6° west of Beta Muscae. It is bright enough to be visible to the naked eye as a dim, orange-hued star with an apparent visual magnitude of 5.73, forming a visual pair with nearby Zeta2 Muscae. The ζ1 Mus system is around 417 light-years distant from the Sun, based on parallax, and is drifting further away with a radial velocity of +21 km/s.

The suspected astrometric component of the ζ1 Mus system was identified from acceleration behavior in the proper motion of the main star. The visible component is an aging giant star with a stellar classification of K0III; a star that has used up its core hydrogen and is cooling and expanding. It now has 15 times the girth of the Sun and is radiating 98.5 times the Sun's luminosity from its swollen photosphere at an effective temperature of 4,737 K.

References

K-type giants
Musca (constellation)
Muscae, Zeta1
Durchmusterung objects
107567
060329
4704